The 2013 Indonesian Premier League was the 2nd and final season of the Indonesian Premier League (IPL), a fully professional football competition as the shared top tier of the football league pyramid in Indonesia with the Indonesia Super League before the two leagues merged for the 2014 season. The season began on 16 February 2013. Semen Padang were the defending champions, having won their 1st league title .

Teams 

PSMS Medan were relegated during the end of the previous season. They were replaced by the best three teams (three group champions) from the 2011–12 Liga Indonesia Premier Division, Persepar Palangkaraya, Perseman Manokwari and Pro Duta FC.

Eleventh place Indonesian Premier League side Bontang FC managed to retain his place in the highest competition after finishing as champions of the play-offs.

Two Premier Division group runner-up last season side PSLS Lhokseumawe and PSIR Rembang managed promotion after finishing runner-up and third-place in the play-offs.

Stadium and locations

Personnel

Coaching changes

Pre-season

In season

League table

Results

Season statistics

Top scorers

Updated to games played on 4 September 2013.Source: IPL Topscorer

Play-off round
After the meeting on Wednesday, 2 October 2013 between PSSI and PT. Liga Prima Indonesia Sportindo and club participants Indonesian Premier League (IPL), they decided that the IPL competition was stopped and the entire first and second round scores were not recognized. Due to this on Thursday 3 October 2013 PSSI executive committee decided to hold a play-off to determine which club was eligible for the verification of 2014 Indonesia Super League club participants and also determine the champions of IPL 2013 season.

Ten clubs participated in the play-off. These were Persiraja Banda Aceh, PSLS Lhokseumawe, Pro Duta FC, Persijap Jepara, PSIR Rembang, Persiba Bantul, Bontang FC, PSM Makassar, Persepar Palangkaraya and Perseman Manokwari. Meanwhile, Persebaya 1927 and Arema Indonesia were disqualified for not being official members of the PSSI. While Semen Padang FC received a wildcard to qualify directly for the finals and 2014 leagues verification as the defending champion of last season and in the standings this season they were top of the standings.

As for the format of the play-off with the home tournament system, Jepara (Gelora Bumi Kartini) and Bantul (Sultan Agung Stadium) were appointed as the hosts. Play-offs were divided into two groups with five teams each, the top three teams of each group qualified for the following leagues verification. While the winner of each group qualified for the semi-finals of the play-offs, the winner advanced to the finals to face with Semen Padang to determine the champion of the 2013 Indonesian Premier League.

The play-off was originally scheduled to start on 16 October and finish on 2 November 2013.

Group stage
Group stage draw was made on Friday on 4 October 2013 at the headquarters of the Football Association of Indonesia. Among the group stage started on 16 October 2013 and finished on 25 October 2013.

Group K

Group L

Knockout stage
The knockout stage started on 28 October and was scheduled to finish on 2 November 2013 in grand final match. However, three days before the start of the knockout stage on 25 October 2013, PSSI secretary-general Joko Driyono announced the cancellation of the 2013 IPL play-off final match, citing that the game was not a priority as the league competition was already finished, since it had been cancelled by PSSI. He elaborated that the main objective of the play-off was to determine seven teams that would join the new unified league in 2014, pursuant to a verification process. According to Joko, other agendas were not considered not a priority.

The cancellation meant that there was no league champion for the IPL's final season; rather, the winner of the semifinal match earned the title of 2013 IPL play-off champion. Three days after the announcement by PSSI, Pro Duta FC defeated Persepar Palangkaraya in the final IPL match that was ever played to win the title. It also solved a scheduling problem: Semen Padang was committed to play in a tournament in Vietnam from 25 October to 3 November, making it impossible for them to play in the final match that was scheduled for 2 November. Ultimately, Pro Duta and Persepar (along with Perseman) did not participate in the ISL as PSSI denied them licenses during the verification process.

Semi-finals

Final

References

External links
 IPL results and league table at Soccerway

 
2012–13 in Asian association football leagues
2013–14 in Asian association football leagues
1
2013